Hoo Anthiya Uhoo Anthiya is a 2001 Indian Kannada-language romantic drama film directed by K. Praveen Nayak and produced by N. Bharathi Devi. The film stars Ramesh Aravind, Isha Koppikar and Anu Prabhakar.

The film released on 13 October 2001 to generally positive reviews from critics who lauded the lead actors performance and the musical score by Karthik Raja, making his debut in Kannada cinema.

Cast
 Ramesh Aravind as Shivu
 Isha Koppikar as Usha
 Anu Prabhakar as Chandana
 Karan as Karan
Avinash
Sumanth 
Praveen Nayak 
Pushpa Swamy

Soundtrack

The music of the film was composed by Karthik Raja. Bollywood playback singer Sadhana Sargam made her first Kannada language recording with this soundtrack.

References

External source
 
 movie info

2001 films
2000s Kannada-language films
2001 romantic drama films
Indian romantic drama films
Films scored by Karthik Raja